Sarab-e Karzan (also Romanized as Sarāb-e Kārzān and Sarāb-e Kārāzān) is a village in Karezan Rural District, Karezan District, Sirvan County, Ilam Province, Iran. At the 2006 census, its population was 746, in 151 families. The village is populated by Kurds.

References 

Populated places in Sirvan County
Kurdish settlements in Ilam Province